After the Fall is the fourth and final studio album from American hardcore punk band 98 Mute. It was released on April 9, 2002 by Epitaph Records. All of their albums were co-produced by Fletcher Dragge of the band Pennywise. It was released on enhanced CD containing a band bio, photos and an exclusive video interview followed by a live rendition of Black Flag's "No Values".

Overview
On this recording, the band continued the musical progression which began on Class Of 98 and grew through Slow Motion Riot. The production was more raw, but the heaviness of the previous album had been toned down a tad. The positive lyrical themes which the band had become known for were also evident again.

Track listing
All songs written by 98 Mute
"Something In The Water" – 2:44
"Bullet For You" – 3:24
"M.A.D." – 3:15
"True To Yourself" – 2:38
"They Say" – 2:42
"Where Did It All Go Wrong" – 2:43
"Ultimate High" – 2:32
"Injection" – 2:29
"Not Enough" – 2:46
"Man Of The Hour" – 2:39
"Small Minds" – 2:14
"End Of Time" – 2:44
"Same Old Song And Dance" – 3:19

Personnel
 Pat Ivie – vocals
 Jason Page – guitar
 Doug Weems – bass
 Justin Thirsk – drums
 Recorded at Stall #2, Redondo Beach, California, USA
 Produced and mixed by Fletcher Dragge and Darian Rundall
 Engineered by Darian Rundall
 Mastered by Gene Grimaldi at Oasis Mastering

References

External links
98 Mute official website
Epitaph Records band page
Theologian Records website

2002 albums
98 Mute albums
Epitaph Records albums